The Williams FW43 is a Formula One car constructed by Williams to compete in the 2020 Formula One World Championship. The car was driven by Nicholas Latifi and George Russell, who were in their first and second year with the team respectively. Jack Aitken, Roy Nissany, Jamie Chadwick and Dan Ticktum acted as reserve and development drivers for the team.

One of these reserve drivers, Jack Aitken, made his Grand Prix debut in the FW43 at the 2020 Sakhir Grand Prix, replacing George Russell who was called up by Mercedes for the same event after Mercedes' regular driver, Lewis Hamilton, tested positive for coronavirus and was forced to miss the event as a result. Russell returned to Williams for the season finale in Abu Dhabi after Hamilton was cleared to race for Mercedes in that event with Aitken returning to reserve driver.

The car was designed by Doug McKiernan and Dave Wheater with new recruits David Worner and Jonathan Carter acting as Chief Designer and Deputy Chief Designer respectively. The car was planned to make its competitive debut at the 2020 Australian Grand Prix, but this was delayed when several races were postponed or cancelled in response to the COVID-19 pandemic. The FW43 made its debut at the 2020 Austrian Grand Prix.

Under an agreement reached between teams and the Fédération Internationale de l'Automobile, 2020-specification cars—including the FW43—saw their lifespan extended to compete in 2021. Williams introduced the FW43B for use in 2021.

Initial design 
The car was designed by David Worner and Jonathan Carter, both of whom are in their first year in the team having previously worked with Red Bull and Renault respectively. Williams have described the FW43 as being an evolution of its predecessor, believing the FW42 was a good basis on which to design the FW43.

Several major changes were made regarding the side pods. Firstly the car introduced a steep slope from the top of the side pod to the floor to as to encourage the air to reach the floor of the car. Williams have also reduced the size of the air inlets on the front of the side pods and have flattened the outer surface of the side pod. The wing mirror and wing mirror supports have also seen aerodynamic refinement.

2020 pre-season 

After experiencing their worst season in the team's history, which included missing the first two days of pre-season testing in 2019, testing for the 2020 season went much more smoothly for Williams. George Russell commented that he believed that Williams still had the slowest car after the team finished last in the preceding season, but that it was an improvement on its predecessor, the FW42.

The FW43 appeared in pre-season testing with a red, white and blue livery branded with the logo of the team's title sponsor, telecommunications company ROKiT. However, in late May, prior to the start of the delayed 2020 season, the team announced that the title sponsorship arrangement with ROKiT had been terminated and that a new livery would be revealed before the first race.

Competition history

FW43 
Russell and Latifi qualified 17th and 20th respectively for the season-opening . Russell retired from the race with a fuel pressure issue, having been running in 13th place, whilst Latifi finished last of the running cars in 11th. Deputy team principal Claire Williams remarked that the team's performance marked a "turning point" in comparison to their difficult  campaign. Russell started 11th at the  after a rain-affected qualifying session, narrowly missing out on Q3. This marked Williams' first Q2 appearance since the 2018 Brazilian Grand Prix and the team's best starting grid position since the 2018 Italian Grand Prix. Although the car was an improvement in pace over the FW42, Williams failed to score a single point in a season primarily due to its high sensitivity while running behind other cars. In the end Williams finished in 11th place in 4 races: the Austrian, Italian, Tuscan and Emilia Romagna GPs, 3 courtesy of Latifi, and 1 from Russell. This would be the first time since  where Williams finished pointless in an F1 season.

FW43B 

In March 2021, Williams introduced the FW43B, designed to compete in the 2021 season. The car had its first shakedown in February 2021 at Silverstone with George Russell and Nicholas Latifi behind the wheel. Roy Nissany drove the car during the first two days of pre-season testing. He also drove the car during the first practice session of the 2021 Spanish Grand Prix. Originally, the car was to be introduced in a special AR mobile app where fans could see the car in their tables or garage, but prior to the launch, the app was hacked. Thus, Williams decided to cancel the app. The car's livery pays homage to Williams' successful past, and to Sir Frank Williams, who founded the team, but left it after the 2020 Italian Grand Prix. The FW43B is the first car to compete in a full season without the Williams family managing the team. The car made its debut in the Bahrain Grand Prix. At the Emilia Romagna Grand Prix, both Latifi and Russell retired, after contact with Nikita Mazepin and Valtteri Bottas respectively.

The car represented a strong step forward in qualifying and race pace to its predecessor, with Russell regularly challenging for top 10 qualifying positions, and the team narrowly missing out on points scoring positions towards the middle of the season at France and Austria. The team finally scored their first points of the season at the Hungarian Grand Prix, with Latifi and Russell finishing 8th and 9th on the road, respectively, before being promoted one place up each following Sebastian Vettel's disqualification. The result brought in 10 points and allowed the team to leapfrog Haas and Alfa Romeo to 8th place in the Constructors' Championship.

At the next race in Belgium, Russell qualified 2nd on the grid following a stunning final lap in a chaotic wet session. The following day, conditions meant that the race was delayed, ran for 3 laps under safety car conditions and then red flagged - Russell was classified in the same position, whilst Latifi benefitted from pre-race penalties to be classified 9th. Thus, Williams scored their first podium since the 2017 Azerbaijan Grand Prix, double points for the second consecutive race, and doubled their points tally to 20 points (half points awarded) to take a stranglehold over 8th in the Championship moving the team 17 points clear of the nearest rivals Alfa Romeo.

Three races later in Russia, Russell yet again took advantage of changeable weather conditions to take 3rd in qualifying. He would finish 10th in the race which would prove to be his last points finish for Williams and Williams' last point for the rest of the season.

Complete Formula One results 
(key)

Notes
  Driver failed to finish the race, but was classified as they had completed over 90% of the winner's race distance.
  Half points awarded as less than 75% of race distance completed.

References 

Williams Formula One cars
2020 Formula One season cars
2021 Formula One season cars